Eighteen, Twenty-Nine (also known as 18 vs. 29) is a 2005 South Korean television series starring Park Sun-young and Ryu Soo-young. Based on the Internet novel The 4321 Days We Shared, the romantic comedy series aired on KBS2 from March 7 to April 26, 2005 on Mondays and Tuesdays at 21:55 for 16 episodes.

Plot 
Yoo Hye-chan (Park Sun-young) is a 29-year-old housewife who's unhappily married to a top acting star, Kang Sang-young (Ryu Soo-young). While on her way to court to file for divorce, a car accident drastically changes her life. Though she physically recovers, retrograde amnesia causes Hye-chan to mentally revert to that of an 18-year-old girl, and she finds everything around her unfamiliar.

In high school in the 1990s, Hye-chan considered Kang Bong-man, the most popular boy at school and nicknamed "Ice Prince," as her nemesis. Though seemingly shallow and callous, Bong-man hides his vulnerability due to his infamous family background. But little did Hye-chan know that her despised and hated classmate would become an actor one day, change his name to Kang Sang-young and become her future husband. For Sang-young, seeing his wife reliving their high school days rekindles their lost love, and he strives to mend their shattered marriage and help her recover her memory. Meanwhile, Hye-chan begins to fall for him all over again. The only obstacle is Shin Ji-young (Park Eun-hye), an actress who wants Sang-young for herself.

Cast 
 Park Sun-young - Yoo Hye-chan
 Park Min-ji - young Yoo Hye-chan
 Ryu Soo-young - Kang Sang-young (Kang Bong-man) 
 Choi Si-won - young Kang Bong-man
 Park Eun-hye - Shin Ji-young 
 Lee Joong-moon - Kim Noon
 Shin Goo - Kang Chi-soo
 Jo Eun-ji - Yoo Hye-won
 Jung Ji-ahn - young Yoo Hye-won
 Kim Ji-young - tteokbokki-selling grandma
 Lee Sang-woo - Kang Bong-kyu
 Ahn Nae-sang - Seo Yoon-oh
 Lee Dae-yeon - Choi Ki-ja
 Jeong Da-hye - Lee Eun-ji
 Jo Yang-ja - Park Soon-nyeo
 Kim Da-rae - Lee Sun-mi
 Lee Han-wi - Director Bang

Original soundtrack
 Love Song - Jo Won-seon
 사랑은 유리같은 것 (Love Is Like Glass) - Park Sun-young 
 예감 (Presentiment)
 Memory
 나를 잊지 말아요 (Don't Forget Me) - Natural
 Flown Away
 단 한번이라도 (Just Once)
 So Good Bye
 오늘 하루 (Today Is the Day)
 스물아홉 혜찬 (29-year-old Hye-chan)
 Run
 열여덟 혜찬 (18-year-old Hye-chan)
 Snowy
 Sang-young Story (Guitar ver.)
 Hye-chan 2
 Hye-chan 3
 Love Song (Inst.)

References

External links 
Eighteen, Twenty-Nine official KBS website 

Korean Broadcasting System television dramas
South Korean comedy-drama television series
2005 South Korean television series debuts
2005 South Korean television series endings
Korean-language television shows
South Korean romance television series
Television shows based on South Korean novels